Papilio (Chilasa) paradoxa, the great blue mime, is a swallowtail butterfly found in India and parts of South-East Asia. The butterfly belongs to the mime subgenus, Chilasa, of the genus Papilio (black-bodied swallowtails).  It is an excellent mimic of different species of Euploea (sub-family Danainae).

Description
From Charles Thomas Bingham (1905) The Fauna of British India, Including Ceylon and Burma, Butterflies Vol. 1:

Distribution
The butterfly is found in northern India (including Assam and Arunachal Pradesh), Bangladesh, and Myanmar. It is also found in southern China, Vietnam, Thailand, Laos, Kampuchea, peninsular and eastern Malaysia, Philippines (Palawan), Brunei and Indonesia (Sumatra, Banka, Nias, and Kalimantan).

Status
Never common but not known to be threatened. Considered rare in India by William Harry Evans and Mark Alexander Wynter-Blyth. Only one subspecies of the butterfly occurs in Indian territory, P. (C.) p. telearchus (Hewitson), which is protected by law in India.

Habitat
This is a forest species and is generally found in low elevations.

Mimicry
The typical form of the great blue mime mimics the striped blue crow (Euploea mulciber) in both sexes. There also occurs in India a form danisepa which mimics the magpie crow (Euploea radamanthus). Though the great mimes are easily distinguished when caught, in flight they very closely resemble the mimicked butterflies.

Habits
The flight of the mime mimics that of the species it resembles. It is fond of settling on damp patches.

See also
Papilionidae
List of butterflies of India
List of butterflies of India (Papilionidae)

References
 
 
 

Chilasa
Fauna of Southeast Asia
Butterflies of Asia
Insects of Thailand
Butterflies of Indochina
Butterflies described in 1831